Temple Shaari Emeth (meaning "gates of truth"; Hebrew: השערים של אמת) is a Reform synagogue located at 400 Craig Road in Manalapan, New Jersey, United States.

History
Founded in 1966, Temple Shaari Emeth originally had 50 member families, and had its facilities at two Manalapan residences. Irwin Goldenberg was the congregation’s first religious leader. The congregation established a religious school, with 23 students attending the first class which was held on February 18, 1966 at the two Manalapan homes. The U.S. Route 9 corridor in Manalapan was expanding quickly, and many Jewish families from New York City were relocating to the area. By 1967, the members of Temple Shaari Emeth needed more space for the growing congregation. In 1968, Kevork Hovnanian donated 3.5 acres of land on Craig Road in Manalapan. Construction of the new synagogue began in May 1969 and was completed in April 1970. The synagogue underwent a major renovation in 1990.

Religious school
The religious school has 527 students in grades K-10, with another 16 students enrolled in the school's post-confirmation program (grades 11-12).

Clergy and staff
Rabbi Peter Kasdan of Marlboro served as the temple's religious leader from 1969 to 1971. He was succeeded by Rabbi Phillip Schechter of Freehold, who occupied the position for the next 29 years. In 2003, Rabbi Melinda Panken of New York City became Temple Shaari Emeth's religious leader. Michael Weisser served as cantor from 1971 to 1973. Cantor Wayne Siet of Marlboro served as cantor from 1973 to 2017. Wally Schachet-Briskin has served as cantor since 2017.

Notable congregants
Anthony Firkser (born 1995), football tight end for the Tennessee Titans of the National Football League

References

External links

Buildings and structures in Monmouth County, New Jersey
Manalapan Township, New Jersey
Reform synagogues in New Jersey
Jewish organizations established in 1966
1966 establishments in New Jersey